Irv Hoerr (born November 14, 1946) is an American racing driver from Peoria, Illinois. He is primarily known for racing in several sports car racing series. Hoerr was the 1992 IMSA GTO champion. He moved up to the GTS-1 class winning the 1995 and 1996 titles. Hoerr made seven NASCAR Winston Cup Series starts and had two Top 10 finishes.

Racing career

Sports car racing
Hoerr raced for Rocketsports Racing in International Motor Sports Association (IMSA). He won the 1992 GTO class championship in an Oldsmobile Cutlass. He moved to the GTS class winning the 1995 and 1996 titles.

Hoerr moved to a part-time schedule after the 1996 season and he continued to make occasional starts until 2002. He ended with seven championships, six in four IMSA divisions and another in the Latin America GT series.

NASCAR
Hoerr competed primarily as a road course ringer. He made his first NASCAR start in the final race at Riverside International Raceway in the 1987 Winston Western 500. After not competing in a NASCAR race for a couple seasons, he entered two events in 1990. Hoerr's best NASCAR finish, an 8th place result, happened at Sears Point Raceway; later that season he claimed his only other Top 10 finish when he race to 10th at Watkins Glen International.

Hoerr made his first attempt at an oval track at North Wilkesboro Speedway in 1991 but he failed to make the field. A rear end failed caused him to end up with 36th place finish at Sears Point later that season. Hoerr made his first non-road course at Pocono Raceway (a tri-oval which races similar to a road course); he finished 19th. His last NASCAR start of the season happened at Watkins Glen; it ended after eight laps with engine problems. Hoerr made his last NASCAR start in 1992 at Sears Point; he finished 41st with engine problems.

Honors
He was named the Motorweek Road Race Driver of the Year in 1986.
He was also named the Norelco Cup Driver of the Year in 1989.
The American Auto Racing Writers and Broadcasters Association named him to their All-America Racing Team in 1992 and 1995.
Hoerr was named to the Greater Peoria Sports Hall of Fame.

Personal life
Hoerr operates Hoerr Racing Products in Peoria along with his brother Scott Hoerr.

Motorsports career results

NASCAR
(key) (Bold – Pole position awarded by qualifying time. Italics – Pole position earned by points standings or practice time. * – Most laps led.)

Winston Cup Series

References

External links
Hoerr Racing Products

1946 births
Living people
NASCAR drivers
24 Hours of Daytona drivers
Sportspeople from Peoria, Illinois
Racing drivers from Illinois